Dwight Ramos (born September 2, 1998) is a Filipino-American professional basketball player for Levanga Hokkaido of the Japanese B.League. He played college basketball for the Ateneo Blue Eagles of the University Athletic Association of the Philippines (UAAP). He has also played for the Philippines national basketball team.

Early life and education
Ramos was born on September 2, 1998, in the United States in West Covina, California to Artemio Ramos from Ilocos Sur and Liliya Ramos from Russia. He is the eldest of three children. Ramos is second cousins with Miss Universe Bahrain 2022 Evlin Abdullah-Khalifa, by way of their mothers being cousins.

High school career
He played for the Mustangs, the varsity basketball team of Walnut High School, under head coach Joe Khouzam.

College career

US NCAA
While Ramos was still in high school, he was contacted by coach Tab Baldwin who tried to recruit him to play for Ateneo de Manila University's Blue Eagles in the Philippines once he graduates. However he decided to forego from playing for Ateneo to continue his college basketball career in the United States.

Ramos during his attendance at Fullerton campus of California State University played for the Cal State Fullerton Titans basketball team. He suited up for the team in the NCAA Division I from 2016 to 2018. He then went on to play for the Broncos of California State Polytechnic University in Pomona for one season in the NCAA Division II.

Ateneo Blue Eagles
After playing for the Cal State Pomona Broncos, Ramos went to the Philippines to play for the Ateneo Blue Eagles in the UAAP but had to serve residency in 2019 before he could suit up in official UAAP games. He played for Ateneo in the Philippine Collegiate Champions League helping the team clinch the 2019 league title. He was expected to make his UAAP debut for the Blue Eagles in Season 83 which was cancelled due to the COVID-19 pandemic. He became eligible to enter the PBA draft in 2021, but decided to forego from entering for a chance to play alongside his brother in Ateneo.

Professional career

Toyama Grouses (2021–2022)
Ramos decided to forgo his one year of eligibility in UAAP and he signed with Toyama Grouses of the Japanese B.League on September 10, 2021. Ramos played only for the 2021–22 season with his team finishing 7th in the west conference. Toyama didn't renew his contract.

Levanga Hokkaido (2022–present)
Ramos remained in the B.League, joining Levanga Hokkaido in May 2022 and is set to play for the team at least for the 2022–23 season.

National team career
Ramos has been a prospective member of the Philippines national team by its management as early 2018, when he was included in a 23-member pool intended for the 2023 FIBA World Cup. He debuted for the Philippines in February 2020, playing in the 2021 FIBA Asia Cup qualifier match against Indonesia. The Philippines won 100–70 in that match with Ramos contributing 5 points, 5 rebounds, and 2 steals. Ramos played with a squad reinforced by PBA players in the first window of the qualifiers. Due to the COVID-19 pandemic, subsequent qualifier matches were repeatedly postponed with Ramos flying back and forth between the Philippines and the United States, usually training in the latter where pandemic-related protocols are more lenient.

References

External links
 
 

1998 births
Living people
American men's basketball players
American people of Ilocano descent
American people of Russian descent
Ateneo Blue Eagles men's basketball players
Basketball players from California
Cal Poly Pomona Broncos men's basketball players
Cal State Fullerton Titans men's basketball players
Citizens of the Philippines through descent
Filipino expatriate basketball people in Japan
Filipino people of Russian descent
Filipino men's basketball players
Levanga Hokkaido players
Philippines men's national basketball team players
Point guards
Shooting guards
Sportspeople from West Covina, California
Toyama Grouses players